The 1992 Federal Express International was a men's tennis tournament held in Memphis, Tennessee in the United States. The event was part of the Championship Series of the 1992 ATP Tour. It was the 22nd edition of the tournament and was held from February 10 through February 16, 1994, and played on indoor hard courts. MaliVai Washington, who was seeded 13th, won the singles title.

Finals

Singles

 MaliVai Washington defeated  Wayne Ferreira 6–3, 6–2
 It was Washington's first title of the year, and the first of his career.

Doubles
 Mark Woodforde /  Todd Woodbridge defeated  Kevin Curren /  Gary Muller 7–5, 4–6, 7–6

References

External links
 ITF tournament edition details
 ATP tournament profile

Federal Express International
Tennis tournaments in the United States
Federal Express International
Federal Express International
Federal Express International